Flonicamid is a pyridine organic compound used as an insecticide on aphids, whiteflies, and thrips. It disrupts insect chordotonal organs that can affect hearing, balance, movement to cause cessation of feeding, but the specific target site of the chemical is unknown. It is typically sold as wettable granules mixed with water before spraying.

References

Insecticides
Nitriles
Trifluoromethyl compounds
Pyridines
Drugs with unknown mechanisms of action